Was (or Was... in the UK edition) is a WFA nominated 1992 novel by Canadian author Geoff Ryman, focusing on themes of L. Frank Baum's 1900 novel The Wonderful Wizard of Oz, and the 1939 musical film version, ranging across time and space from 1860s Kansas to late 1980s California.

Was is an adult parallel to the magical Land of Oz that never existed as a real place. The novel explores the tragic but very moving life of "Dorothy Gael" in 1800s Kansas, whose traumatic experiences with Aunt Emily and Uncle Henry after her mother's death leads her to create an imaginary and idealized world in her mind based on some of her real-life experiences as a way of coping with her bleak reality. Due to a tragic and unfortunate upbringing in Kansas, Dorothy's terrible life turns her into a Vile, "wicked" girl, who is unable to be saved. Unlike Baum's fairy tale book, she never gets to experience the magic of Oz, thus turning her into an insane and bitter old woman.

The book goes into depth about the importance of a healthy, stable childhood, and the heartbreaking consequences of the lack of one. The book also explores the life of Judy Garland as she plays Dorothy Gale in the 1939 movie, a homosexual obsessed with the Wizard of Oz and dying of HIV/AIDS, and tells the stories of these characters and how they are all connected to one another without even realizing it.

Plot summary
The novel is separated into three parts, "Winter Kitchen", "Summer Kitchen", and "Oz Circle". The primary focus is on Jonathan, a gay actor with AIDS who goes on a obsessed pilgrimage of sorts to Manhattan, Kansas, and on the "real" (in the novel) Dorothy.

Other characters include L. Frank Baum, who makes an appearance as a substitute teacher in Kansas and who meets Dorothy, and is so inspired and touched by their encounter, he then later decides to make her the main character of his classic fantasy novel. We also meet Millie, a makeup artist on the set of the original 1939 musical film version and narrates an encounter with Judy Garland who plays the fictional version of Dorothy.

Themes
Was discusses a number of complex themes, including the importance of a stable childhood. Much of the novel is devoted to the dreary life that Dorothy Gael (surname different from Baum's character) leads with her aunt and uncle, Emma and Henry Gulch. Neither parental figure is capable of providing Dorothy with the affection or the attention she needs. As a result, she becomes silent at home and aggressive in school.

Jonathan's childhood, in contrast, involves his dependence on the imaginary characters from the first airing of The Wizard of Oz on television.

A fictionalized version of Judy Garland's difficult life as a child actress is also shown, speculating on the marriage of her parents.

Was has been described as more somber than Baum's The Wizard of Oz, and an attempt to correct the deceptive fantasy of that work, illuminating the realistic implications of having a fantasy world to retreat to. It has also been called a critique of American society.

Reception
Was is listed in The Gay Canon as one of the great books that every gay man should read. The Publishing Triangle named the book number 79 on its list of best gay and lesbian novels, and it was republished as a part of Orion's Masterworks series.

Awards and nominations
Finalist for the World Fantasy Award, 1993
Shortlisted for the Locus Award for Best Fantasy Novel, 1993
Inducted into the Gaylactic Spectrum Awards Hall of Fame, 2002

Musical adaptation
A musical production of the book, sponsored by the American Musical Theatre Project, premiered at the Ethel M. Barber Theatre at Northwestern University in October 2005. It was directed by Tina Landau, with libretto and lyrics by Barry Kleinbort, and music by Joseph Thalken. An earlier version of the musical appeared at the Human Race Theatre in Dayton, Ohio.

References

External links

 Was at Worlds Without End

1992 British novels
1992 fantasy novels
Novels by Geoff Ryman
Oz (franchise) books
Novels about HIV/AIDS
Parallel literature
LGBT speculative fiction novels
HarperCollins books
1990s LGBT novels
British LGBT novels
Novels with gay themes